Pedro "Oloy" N.Roa Sr. High School is a secondary school located at P.N. Roa, Calaanan Canitoan, Cagayan de Oro, Philippines.

It was first named Calaanan National High School and on 2009 it was named Pedro "Oloy" N. Roa Senior High School in gratitude to Mr. Pedro "Oloy" N. Roa who donated the said lot.

Schools in Cagayan de Oro
High schools in the Philippines